Kazerne Dossin is a former army barracks in Mechelen, Belgium, currently known as "Hof van Habsburg". It may refer to:

Current
 Kazerne Dossin Memorial, Museum and Documentation Centre on Holocaust and Human Rights (front aisle, since 2012)
 Private apartments (side aisles, since the 1980s)
 Mechelen city archive (back aisle, since 1989)

Historical
 Mechelen transit camp, a detention and deportation camp operated by the Nazis during World War II (1942—1944)